Arian Road railway station is located on Arian Road, Sukkur district of Sindh province of the Pakistan.

See also
 List of railway stations in Pakistan
 Pakistan Railways

References

Railway stations in Sukkur District
Railway stations on Rohri–Chaman Railway Line
Railway stations in Sindh